Melvyn Paul Leffler (born May 31, 1945, in Brooklyn, New York) is an American historian and educator, currently Edward Stettinius Professor of History at the University of Virginia. He is the winner of numerous awards, including the Bancroft Prize for his book A Preponderance of Power: National Security, the Truman Administration and the Cold War, and the American Historical Association’s George Louis Beer Prize for his book For the Soul of Mankind: The United States, the Soviet Union, and the Cold War.

Life
The son of businessman Louis and Mollie Leffler, he married historian Phyllis Koran on September 1, 1968; they have one daughter, Sarah Ann and one son, Elliot.

Education
Leffler received a B.S. from Cornell University in 1966, and a Ph.D. from Ohio State University in 1972.

Career
Leffler taught at Vanderbilt University as assistant professor in 1972 to 1977, and associate professor of history in 1977 to 2002. He was chairman of the department of history and dean of the college and Graduate School of Arts & Sciences at the University of Virginia from 1997 to 2001. In 1994, he was president of the Society for Historians of American Foreign Relations. He was Harold Vyvyan Harmsworth Professor of American History at the University of Oxford from 2002 to 2003. He currently teaches at the University of Virginia as a professor of history and is a scholar of the Miller Center.

Books he has authored or edited include the following: Safeguarding Democratic Capitalism: U.S. Foreign Policy and National Security, 1920-2015 (Princeton University Press, 2017); The Cambridge History of the Cold War (3 vols.; Cambridge University Press, 2010); and The Cold War: An International History (2nd ed.; Routledge, 2005).

In 2014, the University of Virginia gave him its Thomas Jefferson Award for excellence in scholarship. The Society of Historians of American Foreign Relations honored him in 2012 with its Laura and Norman Graebner Award for lifetime achievement and service.

Leffler has served on advisory committees to the State Department and the Central Intelligence Agency, particularly concerning the declassification of documents.

Awards
 2008 George Louis Beer Prize for For the Soul of Mankind: the United States, the Soviet Union, and the Cold War
 2004-2005 Randolph Jennings Fellow, United States Institute of Peace
 2004-2005 Henry Kissinger Fellow, Library of Congress
 2001-2002 Woodrow Wilson International Center for Scholars Fellow
 1993 Bancroft Prize for A Preponderance of Power: National Security, the Truman Administration and the Cold War
 1993 Ferrell Prize
 1993 Hoover Prizes
 1993, 1997 Norwegian Nobel Peace Institute Fellowship
 1973, 1984-85 American Council of Learned Societies, Fellowships, Grants-in-Aid
 1984-85 Lehrman Institute Fellowship

Selected publications 

"Inside Enemy Archives: The Cold War Reopened", Foreign Affairs, July/August 1996

  (2nd edition)

Confronting Saddam Hussein: George W. Bush and the Invasion of Iraq, Oxford University Press, 2023.

Editor
(Co-editor with Odd Arne Westad). 
(Co-editor with Jeffrey Legro). 
(Co-editor with David S. Painter).

References

External links
"Capsule Reviews: For the Soul of Mankind: The United States, the Soviet Union, and the Cold War", Foreign Affairs, G. John Ikenberry, November/December 2007
"Capsule Reviews: A Preponderance Of Power: National Security, The Truman Administration, And The Cold War", Foreign Affairs, Gaddis Smith, Spring 1992
"Capsule Reviews: To Lead the World: After the Bush Doctrine", Foreign Affairs, Walter Russell Mead, November/December 2008 1231

21st-century American historians
21st-century American male writers
Cornell University alumni
Ohio State University alumni
Vanderbilt University faculty
University of Virginia faculty
Living people
Bancroft Prize winners
Harold Vyvyan Harmsworth Professors of American History
1945 births
American male non-fiction writers